Thierno Youm, (born April 17, 1960, in Rufisque, Senegal) is a former forward.

External links

Profile
Profile at afterfoot.com

Living people
1960 births
Senegalese footballers
Senegalese expatriate footballers
Senegal international footballers
1986 African Cup of Nations players
1992 African Cup of Nations players
Stade Lavallois players
FC Nantes players
Ligue 1 players
ASC Jaraaf players
Association football forwards
AC Avignonnais players
People from Rufisque
Senegalese expatriate sportspeople in France
Expatriate footballers in France